The 1899–1900 MIT Engineers men's ice hockey season was the 2nd season of play for the program.

Season
Students at MIT formed the ice hockey club in November 1899 in order to introduce the game to the entire student body. 

The team did not have a head coach but Roger Burr served as team manager and president.

Note: Massachusetts Institute of Technology athletics were referred to as 'Engineers' or 'Techmen' during the first two decades of the 20th century. By 1920 all sports programs had adopted the Engineer moniker.

Roster

Standings

Schedule and Results

|-
!colspan=12 style=";" | Regular Season

References

MIT Engineers men's ice hockey seasons
MIT
MIT
MIT
MIT
MIT
MIT